To Bed To Battle is the second studio album by indie rock band Look Mexico. It was released on March 23, 2010.

Track listing
"You Stay. I Go. No Following." - 3:41
"No Wonder I'm Still Awake" - 4:38
"Take It Upstairs, Einstein" - 2:56
"I Live My Life A Quarter Mile At A Time" - 3:28
"Until The Lights Burn Out?" - 4:55
"They Offered Me A Deal (I Said No, Naturally)" - 2:41
"Get In There, Brother!" - 2:32
"They Only Take The Backroads" - 3:33
"Time For You To Go Do Your Own Thing" - 2:58
"Just Like Old Times" - 6:51

2010 albums
Look Mexico albums